The 2007 Fresno State football team represented California State University, Fresno in the 2007 NCAA Division I FBS football season. This season was the Bulldogs' 27th in their current home of Bulldog Stadium in Fresno, California and their 11th with Pat Hill as head coach.

Preseason

At the end of the 2006 season, former offensive coordinator Steve Hagen resigned to accept the coaching position of offensive coordinator at North Carolina. He will be replaced by Oakland Raiders assistant head coach and quarterbacks coach Jim McElwain. Former Fresno State quarterback Jeff Grady, who had worked as an assistant coach at Fresno State in previous years, was promoted to tight end coach for 2007.

Fresno State RB Dwayne Wright decided to forgo his senior season and enter the 2007 NFL Draft at the end of the 2006 season. He was projected as either a late second or early third round draft pick, but was not chosen until the fourth round. RB Lonyae Miller is expected to start in his place.

The Bulldogs opened spring drills on March 7 and the annual spring game took place on April 28.

Schedule

Personnel

Coaching staff

Roster

Depth chart

Game summaries

Sacramento State

Quarterback Tom Brandstater went 16 of 27 for 199 yards in the victory against in-state FCS rival Sacramento State, who was limited to 102 total yards. Lonyae Miller and Clifton Smith both found the end zone for touchdowns, while freshmen running back Ryan Matthews ran for 77 yards on the night. The game also featured Fresno State's retirement of David Carr's No. 8 jersey during the halftime ceremony.

at No. 23 Texas A&M

This was the first-ever meeting between the Fresno State Bulldogs and the Texas Aggies.

The Texas A&M Aggies defeated the Bulldogs 47–45 in triple overtime, despite being outgained 438–393. Tom Brandstater established himself in the loss, going 22–32 for 286 yards and 3 touchdowns. A&M's Jorvorskie Lane rushed for 122 yards on 23 carries, and while Fresno State put together a tremendous second half performance and took the Aggies into three overtimes they could not find the end zone for the final two-point conversion that cost them the game.

ESPN reported, "Texas A&M turned to its powerful running back to stave off Fresno State...  Jorvorskie Lane rushed for two of his four touchdowns in the second and third overtimes as the 23rd-ranked Aggies beat the feisty Bulldogs 47–45 in the first three-OT game in A&M history.  The 6-foot, 268-pound Lane barreled for his final touchdown from 3 yards out, then charged into the end zone again for the winning 2-point conversion on A&M's final possession."

at No. 19 Oregon

In a game marked by an impressive performance by Duck's running back Jonathan Stewart, the Bulldogs were largely outplayed on both sides of the ball in a 21–52 loss. Fresno State put up 327 total yards of offense, compared to Oregon's 461. Oregon was able to control the run very effectively, as Fresno State was only able to run for 60 yards total in the game, compared to 307 by Oregon running backs. Fresno State was able to produce more passing yards than Oregon, with Tom Brandstater going 18 of 32 for 219, compared to Dixon's 14 of 20 for 139 yards. Jonathan Stewart's 17 touches produced 165 yards and two touchdowns, including an 88-yard run.

Louisiana Tech

Fresno State trailed at halftime 6–0 before taking control in the 2nd half in a 17–6 victory in Bulldog Stadium. Running Backs Lonyae Miller, Ryan Mathews, and Clifton Smith combined to rush for 139 yards with Smith producing a fourth-quarter touchdown. Louisiana Tech's quarterback Zac Champion passed for more yards than Fresno State's Tom Brandstater in the loss, going 22 of 48 with 179 yards compared to Brandstater's 8 for 22 attempts for 92 yards. The game was attended by 38,104 fans.

at Nevada

Fresno State earned its second conference win and third overall by beating Nevada in Reno. Fresno State quarterback Tom Brandstater passed for 168 yards going 10 for 16 in the win, but the real star of the game was running back Ryan Mathews, who rushed for 171 yards on 14 carries with three touchdowns. Lonyae Miller ran for 95 yards on 12 carries as well. Remarkably, Nevada-Reno quarterback Colin Kaepernick, a redshirt freshman who came into the game to fill in for starter Nick Graziano, went 23 for 26 for 384 yards in the loss. The recorded attendance was 18,503.

at Idaho

Fresno State quarterback Tom Brandstater went 17 of 22 for 178 yards to secure the away win for the Bulldogs. Lonyae Miller had another 100 yard game, going 108 yards on 18 carries. Idaho's Deonte Jackson also had a big game, rushing for 111 yards on 11 carries. Fresno State only outgained Idaho 421 to 420 in total yardage, but the 4 Idaho turnovers were costly. 14,205 watched the Bulldogs extend their winning streak to 3 in the Kibbie Dome.

San Jose State

Fresno State shutout rival San Jose State in the seventy-second meeting between the two conference opponents, earning the homecoming win. Going into halftime with a 6–0 lead having benefited from two missed Spartan kicks, the Bulldogs blew the game open to start the second half, with a 61-yard kickoff return by A.J. Jefferson, and a 14-yard touchdown run by Ryan Mathews. The freshmen Mathews later had a 58-yard touchdown run in a 144-yard game. Fresno State quarterback Tom Branstater threw for 132 yards, while San Jose State quarterback Adam Trafalis passed for 354 yards, and ran for 97 more in the losing effort. The Fresno State defense was efficient in keeping the powerful San Jose State offense out of the end zone.

Boise State

Utah State

at No. 12 Hawaii

Kansas State

at New Mexico State

Vs. Georgia Tech (Humanitarian Bowl)

Awards
A. J. Jefferson was selected as an All-American for the All-purpose player/return specialist role.

References

Fresno State
Fresno State Bulldogs football seasons
Famous Idaho Potato Bowl champion seasons
Fresno State Bulldogs football